Free Vietnam may refer to:
Republic of Vietnam
Government of Free Vietnam
Third Republic of Vietnam